John Clegg (11 January 1935 – 11 March 2015) was an Australian archaeologist who specialised in the study of rock art in which he was one of the pioneers in Australia.

Early life and education

Clegg was born on 11 January 1935 in Nottingham, England and grew up in Cambridge, where his mother was an academic. John and his sister were evacuated during World War Two to Vancouver, British Columbia, Canada and in this period he began a lifelong interest in sculpture. Returning to England at the end of the war, he attended The Leys School in Cambridge, and then Magdalene College, Cambridge University, where he graduated in 1959 as a Bachelor of Arts with Honours and a Certificate in Education. In 1962, he was awarded an M.A. Honours at Cambridge where he initially read Geography, but after two years changed to Archaeology.

Move to Australia

Clegg undertook excavations with Eric Higgs and Charles McBurney, both of whom were influential on his studies. After these studies he worked as a school teacher, and in 1963-4 travelled to Australia where he excavated at Coygan Cave in South Wales as a contract archaeologist. In 1964, Clegg moved to Brisbane, Queensland and took up a position in archaeology in the Psychology Department of Queensland University.

Academic career

Clegg's Master's Thesis Mathesis Words, Mathesis Pictures, 1978), involved an analysis of the Bare Hill rock art site located near Cairns in Queensland. This was the first study in Australia to examine rock art from an archaeological perspective. He was awarded the University Medal for this work. In the 1980s he took up a teaching position in the Archaeology Department of the University of Sydney. He produced a popular Field Guide to the Rock Art of Sydney (Stanbury & Clegg 1990)

References

Australian archaeologists
Alumni of the University of Cambridge
1935 births
2015 deaths